The heraldic mark of the prime minister of Canada is granted exclusively to holders of the office who pursue an official personal coat of arms from the Canadian Heraldic Authority.

History
Presently, seven former prime ministers have official coats of arms featuring the mark. Chronologically they are: Joe Clark,  Pierre Trudeau, John Turner, Brian Mulroney, Kim Campbell, Jean Chrétien, and Paul Martin.

Gallery

Personal coats of arms
Prime ministers John A. Macdonald and Charles Tupper both had personal coats of arms, however neither feature the heraldic mark because the symbol had not been adopted during their tenure.

See also
Armorial of prime ministers of Canada

References

Government of Canada